Chan Hiu Ming (born 19 March 1975) is a Hong Kong professional football manager.

He holds an AFC Pro License and is also a coaching and fitness instructor for the Asian Football Confederation and FIFA.

Playing career
He was a member of Hong Kong national futsal team,  and Hong Kong Hockey representative team. He also participated in different football clubs in Hong Kong including Kitchee, Instant Dict, Eastern, Wong Tai Sin and Derico for years.

Managerial career

Hong Kong Youth Representative Team
Chan Hiu Ming started his managerial career in 2003 as the head coach of Hong Kong Youth Representative Team and assistant coach of Hong Kong Olympics Team. He succeeded with the Hong Kong Youth Representative Team as the team were crowned Champion of the International Invitation Tournament organised by the Hong Kong Football Association in 2004; Champion of the Lion City Cup organized by the Singapore Football Association in 2005 and the Champion of the International Invitation Tournament again in 2006.

Tai Po
Chan was appointed the head coach of Tai Po Football Club for the 2006–2007 season. In this season, he utilized the relatively inexperienced youth players such as Lee Wai Lim and Lee Hong Lim, who would later play for the senior national team. They finished the season in the 5th place, surpassing the expectations of critics and players alike.

Workable
Chan Hiu Ming was the team manager of Workable Football Club in 2007–2008. In this season, future stars Au Yeung Yiu Chung, Yapp Hung Fai, Tsang Man Fai and Tsang Kam To excelled under Chan's guidance, beating league heavyweights South China and Kitchee during his tenure as boss.

Eastern
Chan Hiu Ming was the team manager of Eastern Football Club in 2008–2009. In this season, he took the popularly supported club on a good run in the AFC cup as they beat Hanoi from Vietnam and Chonburi from Thailand.

HK Pegasus
Chan Hiu Ming was the head coach of TSW Pegasus Football Club in 2010–2012. In these two seasons, the team played entertaining football under Chan with great results.

Macau
On 26 July 2017, Chan Hiu Ming took charge of Macau after Tam Iao San resigned citing family reasons.

Lee Man
On 21 May 2018, Lee Man announced that they hired Chan as their head coach.

On 5 February 2023, Chan was sacked by Lee Man.

References

External links
 

1975 births
Living people
Hong Kong football managers
Eastern Sports Club football managers
TSW Pegasus FC managers
Alumni of the University of Hong Kong